Anhelina Kalinina was the defending champion but chose not to participate.

Sara Errani won the title, defeating Dalma Gálfi in the final, 6–4, 1–6, 7–6(7–4).

Seeds

Draw

Finals

Top half

Bottom half

Qualifying

Seeds

Qualifiers

Draw

First qualifier

Second qualifier

Third qualifier

Fourth qualifier

References

External links
Main Draw
Qualifying Draw

Grand Est Open 88 - Singles